Ask the Stars is an upcoming South Korean television series written by Seo Sook-hyang and directed by Park Shin-woo. It stars Lee Min-ho and Gong Hyo-jin in the lead roles. The series follows the fateful encounter of a space-tourist and an astronaut on a space station.

Cast 
 Lee Min-ho as Gong Ryong
 An obstetrician-gynecologist with a strong sense of responsibility who arrives at the space station as a tourist.
 Gong Hyo-jin as Eve Kim
 A Korean-American astronaut.
 Han Ji-eun as Choi Go-eun 
 CEO of Mirae Electronics. She is the daughter of Mirae Group Chairman, Choi Jae-ryong, and Gong Ryong's fiancé.
 Oh Jung-se Kang Kang-su
 A space experiment expert who has been on the space station for 10 months.
 Kim Joo-hun as Park Dong-ah 
 A veteran astronaut who has been to the space station three times and is a member of Seoul's MCC with Eve Kim.

Special appearances 
 Park Jin-joo as a reporter

Production

Casting 
On November 18, 2021, it was revealed that Lee Min-ho and Gong Hyo-jin were in talks to take on the lead roles of a new drama series written by writer Seo Sook-hyang. On January 26, 2022, it was revealed that Oh Jung-se was offered a role and that the proposal is under review. On March 28, 2022, Lee and Gong were confirmed as the leads.

Filming 
Filming began in April 2022. On February 8, 2023, Lee Min-ho posted on Instagram that the filming of the series has ended.

References

External links 
 
 

Upcoming television series
Korean-language television shows 
2023 South Korean television series debuts
TVN (South Korean TV channel) television dramas
Television series by Studio Dragon
Television series by KeyEast
South Korean science fiction television series
South Korean romantic comedy television series
Television series set in outer space
Television series about astronauts